Sofyane Cherfa (born 13 August 1984) is an Algerian former professional footballer who played as a centre-back.

Club career

Early career
Born in Toulouse, France, Cherfa played youth football with AS Monaco FC, but only appeared for its reserve team as a senior. After playing with CS Louhans-Cuiseaux in the lower leagues he signed with Ligue 2 club Stade de Reims in the summer of 2007, before going on to represent also in the competition CS Sedan Ardennes and LB Châteauroux.

Omonia
In 2011, Cherfa joined AC Omonia in the Cypriot First Division, after fellow league side Ermis Aradippou FC did not have the financial means to complete the transfer. He scored his first goal as a professional on 29 October of that year in a 2–0 away win against Olympiakos Nicosia, and also contributed with six appearances in the season's Cypriot Cup, which ended in conquest as in the previous year.

In the 2012 summer transfer window, after being deemed surplus to requirements, Cherfa was loaned to Panthrakikos F.C. from Greece. At the end of the campaign he returned to Omonia, who had just lost fellow stoppers Christos Karipidis and Savo Pavićević to other clubs, but Panthrakikos contested that the agreement ended sooner than it should have.

After failing to negotiate a new contract with a smaller wage, due to Omonia's financial situation, Cherfa was made to train alone, and was eventually linked to OFI Crete F.C. even though the former stated it did not have the intention of releasing him. After the team failed to perform in their UEFA Europa League campaign, both defensively and overall, a new round of talks started, and he eventually put pen to paper to a new three-year deal.

Later years
On 15 January 2016, four days after being released by Panthrakikos, Cherfa signed a two-year contract with Algerian club CS Constantine. Two years later, the free agent agreed to a one-year deal at Italian amateurs Abano Calcio.

Cherfa returned to the Cypriot top level on 27 July 2018, joining Alki Oroklini for one season. On 18 August 2019, he joined Akritas Chlorakas.

International career
In April 2005, Cherfa was called up to the Algerian under-23 team for a mini training camp in France.

Personal life
Cherfa's younger brother, Walid, was also a footballer. A defender, he too played most of his career in France.

Club statistics

Honours
Omonia
Cypriot Cup: 2011–12

References

External links

1984 births
Living people
French sportspeople of Algerian descent
Footballers from Toulouse
Algerian footballers
French footballers
Association football defenders
Ligue 2 players
Championnat National players
AS Monaco FC players
Louhans-Cuiseaux FC players
Stade de Reims players
CS Sedan Ardennes players
LB Châteauroux players
Cypriot First Division players
AC Omonia players
Alki Oroklini players
Super League Greece players
Panthrakikos F.C. players
Algerian Ligue Professionnelle 1 players
CS Constantine players
Algerian expatriate footballers
Expatriate footballers in Cyprus
Expatriate footballers in Greece
Expatriate footballers in Italy
Algerian expatriate sportspeople in Cyprus
Algerian expatriate sportspeople in Greece